1983 is a Polish thriller drama streaming television series produced for and released by Netflix on 30 November 2018. The series, created and written by Joshua Long and based on an original idea by Long and Maciej Musiał, is set in an alternate timeline in which the fall of the communist Polish People's Republic never happened, and the Iron Curtain is still in place. It is Netflix's first Polish original series.

Premise 
The series is set in 2003; a coordinated terrorist attack on multiple sites took place in Poland in 1983 which altered the course of history. The Iron Curtain is still in place and the Cold War did not end. Law student Kajetan (Maciej Musiał) and Citizens' Militia investigator Anatol (Robert Więckiewicz) uncover a conspiracy that could potentially start a revolution.

Setting 

The story is set in a gloomy and cold Warsaw, where dilapidated, grimy Soviet-style apartment blocks stand side by side with futuristic and imposing government and police buildings. The secret police of the Security Bureau now use computer surveillance mechanisms, tracking cell phones and digitizing citizens' data (classified according to their "level of danger"). People need to scan their digital ID cards before entering government buildings, leaving a record of their activities.

Society is run by the "Party", a privileged elite who enjoy a good education, high economic and social status, and live in gated compounds. The rest of the population is disinterested in politics and are distracted by escapism and consumerism, at least for goods that are not censored or prohibited. Many Western 
books are censored. The "Light Brigade", a group of young resistance fighters, oppose this dictatorship.

Poland is imagined to have seen massive immigration from Indochina, and in particular from the socialist republic of Vietnam. Some night scenes set in overcrowded Asian neighborhoods hint at Ridley Scott's Blade Runner.

There are few explicit references to communism in the series (no statues of Lenin in the streets, no red stars on uniforms or revolutionary chants). The regime created an Orwellian state, whose sole ideological goal is the suppression of dissent and the control of individuals.

Cast

Main 
 Maciej Musiał as Kajetan Skowron
 Robert Więckiewicz as Anatol Janów
 Michalina Olszańska as Ofelia Ibrom 
 Zofia Wichłacz as Karolina Lis
 Andrzej Chyra as Władysław Lis

Recurring 
 Ewa Błaszczyk as Maria Gierowska
 Edyta Olszówka as Julia Stępińska 
 Agnieszka Żulewska as Maja Skowron 
 Wojciech Kalarus as Mikołaj Trojan
 Mirosław Zbrojewicz as Kazimierz Świętobór
 Patrycja Volny as Dana Rolbiecki
 Vu Le Hong as Bao Chu ("Uncle")
 Clive Russell as William Keating
 Mateusz Kościukiewicz as Kamil Zatoń

Episodes

Production 
On 6 March 2018, Netflix announced that the series was in production, consisting of 8 episodes. On 2 October 2018, the first teaser trailer was released, with the series set to premiere globally on 30 November.

A second season is being considered.

References

External links 
 
 1983 on Netflix

Polish-language Netflix original programming
Polish television series
2018 Polish television series debuts
Alternate history television series
Television series set in 2003
Television shows set in Poland
Television shows set in Warsaw
Television series about the Cold War
Dystopian television series